Mo is a 2010 TV film about the later life and career of the British Labour Party politician Mo Mowlam, written by Neil McKay and directed by Philip Martin.

Synopsis
Mo stars Julie Walters as Mo Mowlam, the controversial but popular Secretary of State for Northern Ireland.

Early advertisements for the film showed a scene in which Mowlam removes her wig during a meeting with Gerry Adams and Martin McGuinness. It was first shown on UK television on Channel 4 on 31 January 2010.

Cast

Reception
The programme attracted over 3.5 million viewers on its first broadcast, making it Channel 4's highest rating drama since 2001. The biopic was also a critical success, with Mowlam's former ministerial colleague, Adam Ingram MP, depicted in the drama by Gary Lewis claiming that it "brought home the essence of Mo".

Awards and nominations
The biopic has been nominated for a BAFTA for Best Single Drama with Julie Walters winning for Best Actress and Gary Lewis being nominated for Best Supporting Actor.

It was nominated for a Magnolia Award for Best Television Film or Miniseries at the 16th Shanghai Television Festival in China.

References

External links 

British television films
2010 television films
2010 films
Films directed by Philip Martin (director)